Poplar Hall may refer to:

Poplar Hall (Newark, Delaware), listed on the National Register of Historic Places in New Castle County, Delaware
Poplar Hall (Norfolk, Virginia), listed on the National Register of Historic Places in Norfolk, Virginia